Old Waverly Golf Club, located in West Point, Mississippi, is an 18-hole championship golf course founded by the George Bryan family and 29 other founders in 1988. Designed by U.S. Open Champion Jerry Pate and Bob Cupp, Old Waverly has hosted many tournaments across all levels of golf, most notably the 1999 U.S. Women's Open and 2019 U.S. Women's Amateur. Old Waverly's second course, Mossy Oak Golf Club, was designed by Gil Hanse and opened September 2, 2016 on an adjacent property.

Course - Old Waverly

Mossy Oak Golf Club
Designed by Gil Hanse, Mossy Oak Golf Club is Old Waverly's second course and opened for preview play September 2, 2016.

Course - Mossy Oak

Gallery

References

External links

 Aerial view from Google Maps
3D Course Planner at ProVisualizer

Golf clubs and courses in Mississippi
Sports organizations established in 1988
1988 establishments in Mississippi
Buildings and structures in Clay County, Mississippi